Lieutenant General Alok Singh Kler, PVSM, VSM, ADC is a retired General Officer in the Indian Army who last served as  General Officer-Commanding-in-Chief of the South Western Command. He assumed office on 1 September 2019, taking over from Lt Gen Cherish Mathson.

Early life and education 
Alok was born into the Kler military family which originated in Kakrala Kalan near Ludhiana, Punjab, India. The family has over 300 years of service in the Indian Armed Forces. His father, Gen Gurdev Singh Kler was Mentioned in dispatches (MiD) in Sialkot in Indo-Pakistani War of 1965 fighting with 18th Cavalry. Commanding 56 Brigade, he was awarded the Ati Vishisht Seva Medal (AVSM) for capturing the largest group of armed insurgents in Nagaland in the 1970s. Commanding an armoured brigade and division, he was Director General of Military Training (DGMT) and commanded the Armoured Corps Centre and School in Ahmednagar, Maharashtra before retiring as a Lieutenant General.

His elder brother, Jasjit Singh Kler was in the Indian Air Force. He served as the Commandant of the National Defence Academy before retiring as an Air Marshal. His Uncle, Gen Hardev Singh Kler was awarded the Mahavir Chakra in the Indo-Pakistani War of 1971 for commanding 95 Brigade. His formation was among the first to enter Dhaka. Alok's father-in-law, Brigadier Narinder Singh Sandhu saw action in both the wars of 1965 and 1971 and was awarded the Mahavir Chakra. Alok attended Mayo College, Ajmer before graduating from the National Defence Academy and the Indian Military Academy.

Career
Kler was commissioned into 68 Armoured Regiment in June 1982. He has attended Defence Services Staff College at Wellington, the Battalion Commander Combat Course at Germany, the Higher Command Course at Army War College, Mhow, and the National Defence College at Bangladesh.

Kler commanded an Armoured regiment, an Armoured Brigade in the western sector and the same Armoured Division which was commanded by his father. He later commanded the Strike Corps (II Corps) in the Western theatre. He has also held important staff positions like the Chief of Staff of Army Training Command (ARTRAC). He later served as the Director General Military Training (DGMT). He has been awarded the Vishisht Seva Medal in 2015 and a COAS Commendation card in 2009.

Kler has a keen interest in cycling, fitness and sports. He made news when he cycled 270 km from Delhi to Jaipur to take command of the South Western Command. As an Army Commander, he was entitled to fly down to his headquarters or drive down in a cavalcade of military vehicles.

“Cycling is a terrific workout and I am passionate about it. I believe fitness should be a personal mission and not imposed by the organisation. It sends a message of fitness to the men under my command and others too,” said Gen Kler.

He also carried out a para jump, after taking over the South Western Command. He jumped out an ALH Dhruv helicopter on 25 October. He had earlier, as the DGMT, carried out a para jump Nasik by service aircraft from 10,000-12,000 feet.

Kler retired from the Army on 31 March 2021.

Awards and decorations

Dates of rank

References 

Living people
Indian generals
Recipients of the Vishisht Seva Medal
National Defence Academy (India) alumni
Indian Military Academy alumni
Year of birth missing (living people)
Recipients of the Param Vishisht Seva Medal
National Defence College (Bangladesh) alumni
Army War College, Mhow alumni
Defence Services Staff College alumni